American singer Ciara has appeared in numerous music videos and films. Her videography includes twenty music videos, six guest appearances in other artists' videos as a featured artist, two guest appearances in other artists videos and three film appearances.

Ciara's debut studio album, Goodies, was released in September 2004 and spawned the number-one hit "Goodies" and top-ten hits, "1, 2 Step" and "Oh". It was followed by the DVD/EP, Goodies: The Videos & More, which was certified Platinum by the RIAA and included the videos for its three hit singles and behind-the scenes content. In 2005, Ciara was featured on rapper, Missy Elliott's top-ten hit, "Lose Control"; the video of which received the awards for Best Short Form Music Video at the 48th Grammy Awards (2006) and  Best Dance Video and Best Hip-Hop Video at the 2005 MTV Video Music Awards.  Ciara's second studio album, Ciara: The Evolution, and third studio album, Fantasy Ride, were released in December 2006 and May 2009, respectively. Her fourth album, Basic Instinct, was released in December 2010 and spawned the single, "Ride'; its music video received the award for Best Dance Performance at the 2010 Soul Train Music Awards and was banned by BET and UK music channels for its sexual dances. The singer's self-titled fifth studio album, Ciara was her first release on Epic Records and featured the single, "Body Party", whose music video received the award for Best Dance Performance at the 2013 Soul Train Music Awards. It was followed by her sixth LP, Jackie in 2015.

Ciara made her first film appearance in 2006, in the film All You've Got, she made her second appearance as a struggling singer in the 2012 film Mama, I Want to Sing!.  Ciara made her latest film appearance in That's My Boy alongside Adam Sandler.

Video albums

Music videos

As lead artist

Notes

 "Livin' It Up" features Nicki Minaj; however, she is not featured on the video snippet.

As featured artist

Films

References

Videographies of American artists
Videography